Journal of Analytical Toxicology (JAT) is a peer-reviewed scientific journal focusing on analytical toxicology.

According to Journal Citation Reports it received an impact factor of 3.513, ranking it 23rd out of 92 journals in the category "Toxicology" and 20th out of 86 journals in the category "Analytical Chemistry".

The editor is Bruce A. Goldberger (University of Florida, Gainesville). JAT is the official journal of the Society of Forensic Toxicologists.

External links

References

Toxicology journals
English-language journals
Oxford University Press academic journals
Publications established in 1977
9 times per year journals